Dr. Ahmad Sa'd (25 November 1945 – 20 April 2010) was an Israeli Arab journalist and politician. He served as a member of the Knesset for Hadash between 1996 and 1999 and as editor of the Al-Ittihad newspaper.

Biography
Sa'd studied economics at the University of Leningrad, earning a PhD. He worked as a director of the Tumas Institute for Social and Political Research in Haifa, and was a member of the secretariat of the Supreme Committee monitoring the Arab population in Israel. He has written nine books on economics and Israeli Arabs, as well as writing for Al-Ittihad.

A member of the bureau of both Hadash and its Maki faction, Sa'd was elected to the Knesset on the Hadash-Balad list in 1996, and served on the Knesset finance committee.

References

External links

1945 births
2010 deaths
Saint Petersburg State University alumni
Israeli economists
Israeli journalists
Arab members of the Knesset
Hadash politicians
Maki (political party) politicians
Members of the 14th Knesset (1996–1999)